Originally produced by Minolta, and currently produced by Sony, the 20mm f/2.8 is compatible with cameras using the Minolta AF and Sony α lens mounts.

See also
 List of Minolta A-mount lenses

Sources
Dyxum lens data

External links
Sony:  SAL-20F28: 20mm F2.8 Fixed lens

20
Camera lenses introduced in 2006